Nasoonaria is a genus of Asian dwarf spiders that was first described by J. Wunderlich & D. X. Song in 1995.

Species
 it contains four species:
Nasoonaria mada Tanasevitch, 2018 – Vietnam
Nasoonaria magna Tanasevitch, 2014 – China, Laos, Thailand
Nasoonaria pseudoembolica Tanasevitch, 2019 – Vietnam
Nasoonaria sinensis Wunderlich & Song, 1995 (type) – China, Laos, Thailand, Indonesia (Sumatra)

See also
 List of Linyphiidae species (I–P)

References

Araneomorphae genera
Linyphiidae
Spiders of Asia